The JPMorgan Chase Building is an office building in San Francisco, California, 560-584 Mission Street, on the border between South of Market and the Financial District. It also has two levels of underground parking and a large plaza. About  of the building is leased to the major tenant JPMorgan Chase. This is one of many new highrise projects completed or under construction on Mission Street since 2000.

Construction and design
SF Curbed describes the building, designed by Cesar Pelli, as a "circa-2002, 31-story minimalist tower wrapped in black steel." The 31-story building is located at 560 Mission Street. Pelli took visual inspiration from the Hallidie Building.

Says SF Gate, the plaza at 560 Mission Street as "outdoor slip of manicured heaven: terraces of grass, groves of bamboo, potted maples in between. Plus plenty of tables and a circular metal sculpture turning gently above a thin sheet of water," saying it has " only bamboo, Japanese maple and grass growing, along with a granite-lined pool and granite and stainless-steel sculpture."

Plaza 
The building's public space has been noted in the press, called one of the "best privately owned open places" in the city by Curbed.

The Privately Owned Public Open Space at the foot of the tower consists of a parklet containing a water feature with seating, a bamboo grove and the kinetic sculpture Annular Eclipse by George Rickey.

Landscape design for the parklet was done by Christian Lemon at the firm Hart Howerton.



Tenants 
 JPMorgan Chase
 Accenture
 Ernst & Young
 Arup

See also

 San Francisco's tallest buildings

References

External links
 JPMorgan Chase Building at Hines Interests Limited Partnership

Office buildings completed in 2002
César Pelli buildings
Hines Interests Limited Partnership
JPMorgan Chase buildings
Skyscraper office buildings in San Francisco
Financial District, San Francisco
South of Market, San Francisco
2002 establishments in California
2002 in San Francisco